Salt Ash is a rural suburb of the Port Stephens local government areas in the Hunter Region of New South Wales, Australia. It is located on the main road between Newcastle and Nelson Bay but is largely undeveloped, partly because it is the location of the Salt Ash Air Weapons Range which is used by pilots from RAAF Base Williamtown for training purposes.

The southern border of Salt Ash is occupied entirely by Stockton Beach. There is co-ed government primary school called Salt Ash Public School located on 4 Salt Ash Avenue.

Tourism
Oakvale Farm & Fauna World is a local tourist attraction.

World War II aircraft crashes
On 14 April 1943 a RAAF Supermarine Spitfire made a forced landing at the "Oaklands" property near Salt Ash.

On 31 January 1945 a RAAF Mosquito broke up in flight over the firing range, killing both crew members.

Notes

References

External links

 Salt Ash at Australian Explorer
 Oakvale Farm & Fauna World website

Suburbs of Port Stephens Council
Beaches of New South Wales